Sunnyside or Sunnyside Farms is a historic slave plantation home located in Woodbine, Howard County, Maryland.

Sunnyside began as a log cabin built in 1800 by Capt. Banjamin Warfield of Cherry Grove's son Joshua Warfield. In 1830, Albert Gallatin Warfield expanded the home, and a second expansion was completed in 1890 by his son Joshua Warfield.

Albert Warfield was known for generously freeing his slaves at the age of 40, albeit at a time when life expectancy was shorter. His son Joshua Warfield operated a title company, and imported food waste for composting fertilizer for soil. The house later passed to Norman Hutton Warfield (1889 - 1955) who worked for the Federal Land Trust. The last Warfield heir to own the estate was the assistant states attorney for Howard County, Albert Gassaway Warfield III (-1983) who worked for Pierce, Fenner and Smith Inc. The farm is now known as Timberleigh Farm

See also
Cherry Grove, HO-1
List of Howard County properties in the Maryland Historical Trust

References

Houses completed in 1800
Howard County, Maryland landmarks
Houses in Howard County, Maryland
Plantations in Maryland